Knight of the Plains is a 1938 American Western film directed by Sam Newfield and written by Fred Myton. The film stars Fred Scott, Al St. John, Marion Weldon, John Merton, Richard Cramer, Frank LaRue and Lafe McKee. The film was released on May 7, 1938, by Spectrum Pictures.

Plot

Cast          
Fred Scott as Fred Brent
Al St. John as Fuzzy
Marion Weldon as Gale Rand
John Merton as Carson / Pedro de Cordoba
Richard Cramer as Clem Peterson
Frank LaRue as J.C. Rand 
Lafe McKee as John Lane
Emma Tansey as Martha Lane
Steve Clark as Sheriff Dykes
Jimmy Aubrey as Henchman 
James Sheridan	as Henchman 
Budd Buster as Manuel

References

External links
 

1938 films
1930s English-language films
American Western (genre) films
1938 Western (genre) films
Films directed by Sam Newfield
American black-and-white films
1930s American films